The electoral district of Hawthorn is an electoral district of the Victorian Legislative Assembly. It was first proclaimed in 1888 taking effect at the 1889 elections.

The seat is located in eastern Melbourne and is centred on the suburbs of Hawthorn and Hawthorn East. It also includes Camberwell and parts of Canterbury, Glen Iris, and Surrey Hills.

It has usually been a safe seat for the Liberal Party and its predecessors, having been held by a number of leaders and senior ministers. With the exception of two occasions when Liberal MPs defected and sat as independents, it has only been held by non-Liberal MPs three times in its history: independent Leslie Hollins from 1940 to 1945, Labor-turned-Labor (Anti-Communist) MP Charles Murphy from 1952 to 1955, and Labor MP John Kennedy from a shock win in 2018, before being unseated by previous Liberal Member, John Pesutto, in 2022.  

Notable former members for Hawthorn include former premiers Sir William McPherson and Ted Baillieu, as well as Walter Jona, a minister in the Hamer government. 

The current member is John Pesutto, the current leader of the Liberal Party in Victoria.

Members for Hawthorn

Election results

References

External links
 Electorate profile: Hawthorn District, Victorian Electoral Commission

Electoral districts of Victoria (Australia)
1889 establishments in Australia
City of Boroondara
Electoral districts and divisions of Greater Melbourne